Tino Piontek (born 12 February 1980), also known as Tino Schmidt and the stage name Purple Disco Machine, is a German disco and house music producer and DJ.

Career 
Tino Piontek was born in Dresden on 12 February 1980, and grew up in East Germany. In 1996, he started producing with the program Cubase and some synthesizers; at the same time he discovered house music on the Dresden nightlife scene. He became active as a DJ himself and in 2012 his first productions appeared. From then on, international DJ performances began and in 2017 his debut album was released on the label Sony Music Entertainment.
He celebrated his greatest success so far in August 2020 with the song "Hypnotized", which he recorded for the vocals together with Sophie and the Giants, which peaked at number two on the Italian singles chart, receiving double platinum certification. In the same year he produced the official remixes of Dua Lipa's "Don't Start Now", Kylie Minogue's "Magic" and Lady Gaga's "Rain on Me". He has his own SiriusXM show on Studio 54 on Fridays called "Purple Disco Tales".

In 2023, he won a Grammy award under the category of Best Remixed Recording, Non-Classical for his remix of Lizzo's "About Damn Time".

Personal life 

Piontek lives in Dresden with his wife and two kids. He is a supporter of Bayern Munich. His father was a record collector and introduced him to the funk music of the 1970s and 1980s.

Discography

Albums

Compilations

Extended plays 
 Sgt. Killer (2011)
 Purple Pianos (2015)
 RPMD (with Robosonic) (2015)
 Tank Drop (2015)
 Walls (2016)
 Emotion (2019)

Singles

References

External links 
 Official website
 
 Purple Disco Machine at Resident Advisor

Musicians from Dresden
1980 births
German house musicians
21st-century German musicians
Living people
Grammy Award winners